Mario Jann (born January 6, 1980) is a German professional ice hockey player. He is currently playing for EHC München in the Deutsche Eishockey Liga (DEL).

References

External links

1980 births
Living people
German ice hockey centres
EHC München players
People from Rosenheim
Sportspeople from Upper Bavaria